Ian McColl was a football player and later, manager.

Ian McColl may also refer to:

Ian McColl, Baron McColl of Dulwich (born 1933), British surgeon, professor, and politician
Ian McColl (journalist) (fl. 1970s), editor of the Daily Express